Dichotomicrobium thermohalophilum is a bacterium from the genus of Dichotomicrobium which was isolated from a solar lake in Elat in Israel.

References

External links
Type strain of Dichotomicrobium thermohalophilum at BacDive -  the Bacterial Diversity Metadatabase

 

Hyphomicrobiales
Bacteria described in 1989